Laurent Gagliardi (born October 18, 1948, in Montreal, Quebec) is a Canadian screenwriter and film director. He is most noted as cowriter with Léa Pool and Michel Langlois of the screenplay for The Savage Woman (La Demoiselle sauvage), for which the trio received a Genie Award nomination for Best Adapted Screenplay at the 12th Genie Awards in 1991, and as the director of the films The Night of the Visitor (La Nuit du visiteur), which was a Genie nominee for Best Theatrical Short Film in the same year, and When Love Is Gay (Quand l'amour est gai), the first documentary film on homosexuality ever released by the French division of the National Film Board of Canada.

References

External links

1948 births
20th-century Canadian screenwriters
21st-century Canadian screenwriters
Canadian male screenwriters
Canadian screenwriters in French
Canadian documentary film directors
Canadian LGBT screenwriters
LGBT film directors
Canadian gay writers
Film directors from Montreal
Writers from Montreal
Living people
Gay screenwriters
21st-century Canadian LGBT people
20th-century Canadian LGBT people